Ashley Bell may refer to:

Ashley Bell (actress) (born 1986), American actress
Ashley Bell (politician), American politician
Ashley Bell, a 2015 novel by Dean Koontz

See also
 Ashleigh Ball